"Dybt vand" is a song by Danish electro, dance and house duo Svenstrup & Vendelboe, featuring vocals from Nadia Malm. It was released in Denmark as a digital download on 22 April 2011. The song peaked at number 1 on the Danish Singles Chart.

Music video 
A music video to accompany the release of "Dybt vand" was first released onto YouTube on 7 June 2011 at a total length of three minutes and thirty-three seconds. As of April 2016 it has received over 3 million views.

Track listing

Chart performance

Release history

References 

2011 singles
Svenstrup & Vendelboe songs
Number-one singles in Denmark
2011 songs
Songs written by Engelina